WIVA may refer to:

 Wisconsin Virtual Academy, A virtual school based in McFarland, Wisconsin
 WIVA-FM